The Ministry of Higher Education, Science and Culture (MESCC;) is the government department of East Timor accountable for higher education and related matters.

Functions
The Ministry is responsible for the design, implementation, coordination and evaluation of policy for the following areas:

 higher education and qualification:
 science;
 technology; and
 arts and culture.

Minister
The incumbent Minister of Higher Education, Science and Culture is Longuinhos dos Santos. He is assisted by Teófilo Caldas, Secretary of State for Art and Culture.

See also 
 List of higher education ministries
 List of science ministries
 List of culture ministries
 Politics of East Timor

References

External links

  – official site  

East Timor
Higher Education, Science and Culture
East Timor
East Timor
East Timor, Higher Education, Science and Culture
2018 establishments in East Timor